Stadel may refer to:

Places
Stadel bei Herrieden, a village in Ansbach, Bavaria, Germany
Stadel bei Niederglatt, a municipality of the canton of Zürich, Switzerland
Stadel (Winterthur), a quarter of Winterthur, Switzerland
Stadel Mountain, a mountain of Delaware County, New York, United States

People with the surname
George Stadel (1881–1952), American tennis player
Willi Stadel (1912–1999), German gymnast

See also
Hohlenstein-Stadel, a cave of Baden-Württemberg, Germany
Städel Museum, an art museum in Frankfurt